Bornem (old spelling: Bornhem) is a municipality located in the Belgian province of Antwerp. There are also the hamlets of Branst, Buitenland, Eikevliet and Wintam. In 2021, Bornem had a total population of 21,428. The total area is 45.76 km².

Geography

Heritage 
 Bornem Castle, Residence of the House Marnix de Sainte-Aldegonde.
 Bornem Abbey, only Cistercian Abbey in Flanders: residence of former general Amadeus de Bie and Henricus Smeulders.

Climate
Bornem has a oceanic climate (Köppen: Cfb).

Notable people
 Walter Boeykens (b. Bornem, 6 January 1938), clarinetist
 Pedro Coloma, Baron of Bornhem, who purchased the lordship in 1586 and renovated the castle
 Jan Hammenecker (Mariekerke, 2 October 1878 – Westrode, 13 June 1932), writer and priest
 Marc Van Ranst (b. Bornem, 20 June 1965), virologist
 Dries De Bondt (b. Bornem, 4 July 1991), cyclist.  2020 Belgian National Road Race Cycling Champion

See also
 Dodentocht
 Bornem Titans, an American football team
  is brewed by Brouwerij Van Steenberge in Ertvelde
 Klein-Brabant

References

External links
 
 studiegroep-fort-bornem 

 
Municipalities of Antwerp Province
Populated places in Antwerp Province